Kassim Basma (born in 1960 in Koidu Town, Sierra Leone) is a multimillionaire Sierra Leonean businessman and the second leading diamond exporter from Sierra Leone, accounting for around 38% of all official Sierra Leone diamond exports. Basma was born in Kono District in Eastern Sierra Leone. He was born into a family of Lebanese descent from the southern Lebanese village of Ain Baal. He is a member of the Basma family, one of the oldest families of Lebanese descent in Sierra Leone.

External links
http://awoko.org/index.php?mact=News,cntnt01,detail,0&cntnt01articleid=1405&cntnt01returnid=15

1960 births
Living people
Sierra Leonean businesspeople
Sierra Leonean people of Lebanese descent
People from Koidu